Lawrence G. Chait (June 27, 1917 – July 18, 1997) was an American advertising executive who was a pioneer in mail order and direct marketing.

He was chairman of Lawrence G. Chait & Co., Inc. He was President of the Direct Marketing Club of New York. His political activities landed him on the master list of Nixon political opponents.

References
Staff report (January 21, 1970). Ad man looks into future. Minneapolis Star Tribune
Staff report (July 28, 1997). Lawrence Chait, 80, Pioneer in Mail Order. New York Times

1917 births
1997 deaths
20th-century American businesspeople